ICDO may refer to:
International Classification of Diseases for Oncology
International Civil Defence Organization